Castro Camera was a camera store in the Castro District of San Francisco, California, operated by Harvey Milk from 1972 until his assassination in 1978.  During the 1970s the store became the center of the neighborhood's growing gay community, as well as campaign headquarters for Milk's various campaigns for elected office.

History

Milk, an avid amateur photographer, was disappointed over a developer ruining a roll of film.  With his then-partner, Scott Smith, Milk opened the store in 1972, using the last $1,000 of their savings.  The store soon became a focus of the growing influx of young gay people, who were coming from across the US to the Castro, where their sexual orientation was accepted.

Beyond selling cameras and film, Milk turned the store into a social center, and a refuge for new arrivals.  He also made it an official polling station for San Francisco elections.  Because he was so well known for his civic involvement promoting gay businesses and gay consumers, Milk soon became known unofficially as the "Mayor of Castro Street".  Daniel Nicoletta, the photographer best known for chronicling Milk and his times, first met Milk as a patron of the store, then later worked there as a store assistant and campaign worker.  Another customer, Anne Kronenberg, who later became Milk's campaign manager, also met Milk at the store, and described her first impression of him as a "raving maniac".  Other members of Milk's inner circle such as Cleve Jones and his speechwriter Frank Robinson met, befriended, and worked with Milk at the store.

Post-closure

The location at 575 Castro Street, a Human Rights Campaign Store as of 2011, was recreated as a set for Milk, the biopic of Milk's life.  The sparse set, carefully built to original detail including an old red couch and barber's chair, drew the attention of many local residents who remembered the original.  The modern-day shop owner and film crew also described seeing a ghost at the store, whom they assumed to be Milk.

A metal plaque set into the sidewalk in front of the store memorializes Milk, and the location has been used as the stepping-off point for an annual memorial march on the date of his death.

Artifacts from Castro Camera, including Milk's barber chair, a collection of antique cameras that was displayed at the store and the front panel of the awning bearing the name of the shop, are preserved in the holdings of the GLBT Historical Society, a museum, archives and research center in San Francisco. The society displayed the camera collection in an exhibition it devoted to Milk in 2003, "Saint Harvey: The Life and Afterlife of a Modern Gay Martyr." In addition, the art director for Milk consulted the collection when creating props for the Castro Camera set.

References

External links

Buildings and structures in San Francisco
Castro District, San Francisco
LGBT history in San Francisco
LGBT places in the United States
Harvey Milk
Retail buildings in California
Photographic retailers
San Francisco Designated Landmarks
1972 establishments in California
Photography companies of the United States
1970s in LGBT history